Maureen Ann Donnelly (born 1954) is an American herpetologist based at Florida International University.

Education and career
She received her B.A. degree from California State University, Fullerton in 1977 and graduated from the University of Miami with her doctorate degree in 1987. Following her Ph.D., she held postdoctoral positions at the American Museum of Natural History and the University of Miami. She joined the faculty of Florida International University in 1994 and, as of 2022, is a professor in the biological sciences department.

Donnelly served as president of the American Society of Ichthyologists and Herpetologists in 2016.

Research
Donnelly's research focuses on the ecology, behavior, and conservation of tropical amphibians and reptiles. Donnelly's early research was on the use of space in the early development of tadpoles.

She has examined the loss of amphibians and reptiles, using Costa Rica as a model for global issues with biodiversity.

Honors and awards 
In 2017 Donnelly received the Robert K. Johnson Award for Excellence in Service from the American Society of Ichthyologists and Herpetologists.

Selected publications

Taxa described
Adercosaurus vixadnexus Myers & Donnelly, 2001
Allobates undulatus (Myers & Donnelly, 2001)
Anolis bellipeniculus (Myers & Donnelly, 1996)
Anomaloglossus tamacuarensis (Myers & Donnelly, 1997)
Arthrosaura montigena Myers & Donnelly, 2008
Arthrosaura synaptolepis Donnelly, McDiarmid & Myers, 1992
Atractus guerreroi Myers & Donnelly, 2008
Bungarus slowinskii Kuch, Kizirian, Nguyen, Lawson, Donnelly & Mebs 2005
Caecilita Wake & Donnelly, 2009
Caecilita iwokramae Wake & Donnelly, 2009
Ceuthomantis cavernibardus (Myers and Donnelly, 1997)
Echinosaura sulcarostrum Donnelly, MacCulloch, Ugarte & Kizirian 2006
Erythrolamprus torrenicola Donnelly & Myers, 1991
Hypsiboas angelicus Myers & Donnelly, 2008
Incilius majordomus Savage, Ugarte & Donnelly, 2013
Microcaecilia savagei Donnelly & Wake, 2013
Petracola waka Kizirian, Bayefsky-Anand, Eriksson, Minh & Donnelly, 2008
Philodryas cordata Donnelly & Myers, 1991
Plica lumaria Donnelly & Myers, 2001
Plica pansticta (Myers & Donnelly, 2001)
Pristimantis auricarens Myers & Donnelly, 2008
Pristimantis avius (Myers & Donnelly, 1997)
Pristimantis cantitans (Myers & Donnelly, 1996)
Pristimantis memorans (Myers & Donnelly, 1997)
Pristimantis pruinatus (Myers & Donnelly, 1996)
Pristimantis yaviensis (Myers & Donnelly, 1996)
Sphenomorphus rarus Myers & Donnelly, 1991
Stefania tamacuarina Myers & Donnelly, 1997
Thamnodynastes duida Myers & Donnelly, 1996
Thamnodynastes yavi Myers & Donnelly, 1996

References

External links

1954 births
Living people
American herpetologists
Women herpetologists
California State University, Fullerton alumni
Florida International University faculty